Mark Arnold-Forster, DSO, DSC (16 April 1920 – 25 December 1981) was an English journalist and author. He is best remembered for his book The World at War, which accompanied the 1973 television series of the same name.

Early years

He was the only son of William Edward Arnold-Forster (b. 1886, d. 1951), painter, publicist, and gardener, and his wife
Katharine "Ka" Laird, née Cox (b. 1887, d. 1938) and grandson of Hugh Oakeley Arnold-Forster. His parents' families included leading politicians and writers, among them Matthew Arnold, and his mother had been close to Rupert Brooke and his group as well as to Virginia Woolf. Shortly after his birth, his parents went to live in a picturesque Cornish house, Eagle's Nest, in Zennor, Cornwall. They placed Mark at the age of seven in a boarding school in the French-speaking part of Switzerland, and at nine in Kurt Hahn's Schule Schloss Salem at Salem in Germany. When Hitler came to power in 1933, Hahn was driven into exile, and Arnold-Forster followed him to a new school, Gordonstoun in Scotland, where he stayed until he left school in 1937. This upbringing made him fluent in French and German. Arnold-Forster won a place to study mechanical engineering at Trinity Hall, Cambridge, but he never took this up. Instead, after a year's apprenticeship during 1938–39 with the Blue Funnel Line, involving a voyage to Manchuria, Arnold-Forster went on to join the Royal Navy.

Wartime career
Mark Arnold-Forster served throughout the Second World War, first as a merchant seaman and then in the Royal Navy Volunteer Reserve. He served on a destroyer on the Murmansk convoy and then (1942–4) on motor torpedo boats in the English Channel. Eventually he was promoted to the rank of lieutenant in command of a flotilla at Dover, despite looking quite young for his age. He limped home from a battle with a broken-down engine after being nearly rammed by a German destroyer. He also laid mines under fire off the French coast and worked for naval intelligence. He was awarded the DSO and DSC, was three times mentioned in despatches, and was demobilized as a reserve Lieutenant in 1946.

Journalism career
In 1946, Arnold-Forster joined the editorial staff of The Manchester Guardian. He worked first in Manchester and then in Germany, where he wrote about the immediate post-war period and the Berlin blockade in 1948. In 1949 he became labour correspondent, a key job he carried out for eight years. He then joined The Observer as a political correspondent, but in 1963 he had a falling out with The Observer over an issue related to an editorial change to one of his articles. He resigned in disgust and returned to The Guardian as chief editorial writer. He later moved to ITN, as deputy to editor Sir Geoffrey Cox, making the switch to television without any difficulty. In the 1970s, he wrote the series The World at War, with narration by Laurence Olivier and Jeremy Isaacs as the producer. He continued to write regular leaders for The Guardian until his death in 1981.

Personal life
On 12 January 1955, he married Valentine Harriet Isobel Dione Mitchison (b. 1930), also a journalist, daughter of the Labour politician Dick Mitchison and the novelist Naomi Mitchison. Both were related to successive secretaries of state for war, Hugh Oakeley Arnold-Forster and R. B. Haldane. They had five children: three sons and two daughters.

Decline and death

Mark Arnold-Forster suffered from persistent ill health in his fifties, in particular a series of minor strokes. In 1979, he developed cancer of the upper colon and died at his home, 50 Clarendon Road, Notting Hill, London, on Christmas Day, 1981. He was cremated at West London crematorium on 5 January 1982.

Books by Arnold-Forster
 Mark Arnold-Forster, The World at War, Publ: Pimlico, Revised Edition, 2001,.
 Mark Arnold-Forster, The Siege of Berlin, Publ: Collins, 1979,.
 Mark Arnold-Forster, The Future of the Labour Party: A Stock-Taking, Publ: Manchester Guardian and Evening News, 1955, ASIN: B0007JWQE2.

Selected publications
 Mark Arnold-Forster, "The East German parliament," Parliamentary Affairs, V(2), pp. 274–280. pdf

References

Bibliography 

 G. Taylor, Changing faces: a history of The Guardian 1956–1988 (1993)
 The Guardian (28 December 1981)
 The Times (13 January 1955)
 The Times (28 December 1981)
 D. Ayerst, Guardian: biography of a newspaper (1971)
 A. Hetherington, 'Guardian' years (1981)
 P. Scott, The battle of the narrow seas, 1939–1945 (1945)
 H. L. Brereton, Gordonstoun (1968)
 H. Röhrs and H. Tunstall-Behrens, eds., Kurt Hahn (1970)
 Bernard Sendall, Origin and foundation, 1946–62 (1982), vol. 1 of Independent television in Britain (1982–90)
 P. Delany, The neo-pagans (1987)
 N. G. Annan, 'The intellectual aristocracy', Studies in social history: a tribute to G. M. Trevelyan, ed. J. H. Plumb (1955), pp. 241–87

External links 

 BBC Archive with reference to Arnold-Forster
 About Arnold-Forster's TV series
  Arnold-Forster's article on East Germany
 Reference to Arnold-Forster's house
 Arnold-Forster anecdotes
 Arnold-Forster's Royal Naval Volunteer (RNVR) record

1920 births
1981 deaths
Alumni of Schule Schloss Salem
Companions of the Distinguished Service Order
Deaths from cancer in England
Deaths from colorectal cancer
English columnists
English male journalists
English male non-fiction writers
English non-fiction writers
English people of Cornish descent
English socialists
Haldane family
People educated at Gordonstoun
People from Notting Hill
People from Swindon
Recipients of the Distinguished Service Cross (United Kingdom)
Royal Naval Volunteer Reserve personnel of World War II
Royal Navy officers of World War II
The Guardian journalists
The World at War